or Simply Matsumoto Yamaga FC (松本山雅FC, Matsumoto Yamaga Efu Shī) is the Japanese football (soccer) club based in Matsumoto, Nagano Prefecture. The club currently play in the J3 League, Japanese third tier of professional football.

History
The club was founded in 1965 by the players who represented Nagano Prefecture. The players frequented a cafe called Yamaga in front of Matsumoto railway station and initially they were simply called Yamaga Club. In 2004, they were renamed as Matsumoto Yamaga FC when nonprofit organisation Alwin Sports Project were set up to support the club with the intention of promotion to J. League. The very coffee shop where they founded the club no longer exists, but the club opened a new one in 2017.

In the 2007 and 2008 season they finished respectively 1st and 4th in the Hokushin'etsu First Division, but failed to gain the promotion to the Japan Football League as they exited at the group stage of the Regional League promotion series against other regional champions. 2008 also brought a crucial Emperor's Cup run, where they defeated former Japanese champions Shonan Bellmare in the third round by penalty kicks, only to be eliminated 8–0 by Vissel Kobe.

The 2009 season brought inconsistency, as they took 4th place in the regional league but knocked Urawa Red Diamonds out of the Emperor's Cup in the second round, their biggest giant-killing ever.

By virtue of winning the Shakaijin Cup, they earned a berth in the Regional League promotion series, and won the series at home to earn promotion to the Japan Football League for 2010. They earned 7th place on their first season in the third tier.

In 2011, despite a season thrown off by the Tōhoku earthquake and tsunami and the resulting inability of Sony Sendai to play a full schedule, Yamaga earned 4th place and were promoted to J. League Division 2. After three seasons they earned their first ever promotion to J1 League, only to be relegated after one season.

After failing to secure promotion in 2016 and 2017, Yamaga finished their 2018 season at the top of the J2 table, winning their first ever league title and securing automatic promotion to J1 in the process. 

This began the downfall of Matsumoto Yamaga FC, due to the club's bad idea of high player turnover. Ahead of the 2020 J2 League, Yamaga turned over more than 20 players, in which began a slow start in 2020, as the club also went through many winless runs, including 5 losses in a row, which at the time was a record amount of defeats for the club in J2. Eventually, in September 2020, manager Keiichiro Nuno was sacked, and the club finished 13th that season. Things were about to get worse as they continued high player turnover, with 27 players leaving and 24 coming to the club before the 2021 J2 League. In June that year, Nuno's replacement, Kei Shibata, was fired from the club, and was replaced with Hiroshi Nanami, who couldn't help the club escape relegation after finishing dead last that season. 

In 2022, Matsumoto played its first season on the J3. Matsumoto failed to be promoted back to the J2 League, as it finished on fourth place in the final standings of the 2022 J3 League season. The club ended tied on points with Kagoshima United, with both having earned 66 points in 34 matches. However, the goal difference stood out in Kagoshima's favour. The club will play its 2nd consecutive season at the J3 on 2023.

Rivalry
The biggest rival of Matsumoto Yamaga are the prefectural neighbors and former Hokushin'etsu League fellows Nagano Parceiro. Matches between those teams are labelled "Shinshū derby" and generate a lot of interest in both cities. For 2011 season, Parceiro joined their rivals in JFL bringing the derby to the national level.

Stadium

Matsumoto Yamaga's home ground is Matsumoto Stadium (popularly known as Alwin) located in the Kambayashi area of Matsumoto city. The stadium has a capacity of 20,000 (16,000 seats and 4,000 standings). It is the third largest Sport venue in Nagano Prefecture.

Mascot 

Theme song 
The club's theme song is "wanna be a superstar" by local rock band ASIAN2.

League & cup record

Key

Honours
J2 League
Champions: 2018
Runners-up: 2014
Hokushin'etsu League
Champions: 1985, 2007
Runners-up: 1979, 1989, 2006
Hokushin'etsu League Division 2
Champions: 2005
All Japan Senior Football Championship
Winners: 2009
Regional Champions League
Winners: 2009

Current squad
.

Out on loan

Club officials
For the 2023 season.

Managerial history

Kit evolution

References

External links
Official website 

 
Football clubs in Japan
J.League clubs
Association football clubs established in 1965
Sports teams in Nagano Prefecture
1965 establishments in Japan
Japan Football League clubs